Euphorbia wakefieldii is a species of plant in the family Euphorbiaceae. It is found in Kenya and possibly Tanzania.

References

wakefieldii
Endangered plants
Taxonomy articles created by Polbot
Taxa named by N. E. Brown